F6, F06, F 6, F.6 or F-6 may refer to:

Science and technology 
 246 (number), in hexadecimal
 Nikon F6, an SLR 35mm camera
 F06, an ICD-10 mental and behavioural disorder code
 F6, a function key on a computer keyboard
 F6, a theoretical level on the Fujita scale of tornado strength
 Force 6, a level on the Beaufort scale of windspeed
 F6, the octave name for the F (musical note) at a frequency of 1396.913 Hz.

Transport

Air 
 Caproni Vizzola F.6, an Italian prototype fighter of 1941 (F.6M) and 1943 (F.6Z)
 F-6 Mustang, a reconnaissance variant of the North American P-51 Mustang World War II fighter
 F-6 Skyray, originally Douglas F4D Skyray, a 1950s/1960s US Navy jet fighter
 FaroeJet (IATA code)
 Grumman F6F Hellcat, an American World War II fighter aircraft
 Hannover F.6, civil configuration of the Hannover CL.V, a 1918 German ground attack aircraft
 Hunter F.6, a 1954 production variant of the Hawker Hunter fighter aircraft 
 Shenyang F-6, an export version of the Chinese Shenyang J-6 jet fighter
 System F6, a DARPA program on developing fractionated spacecraft
 Västgöta Wing, or F 6, a former Swedish Air Force wing

Automotive 
 BYD F6, a Chinese-made midsize sedan
 FPV F6, an Australian-made series of cars by Ford Performance Vehicles
 Princes Motorway, or F6, a motorway between Sydney and Wollongong, New South Wales, Australia
 F-6, a version of the 1948-1952 Ford F-Series pickup trucks

Other 
 Milwaukee Road class F6, a 1925 American 4-6-4 steam locomotive model
 Mosman Bay ferry services (F6), a commuter ferry route in Sydney, New South Wales, Australia
 LNER Class F6, a class of British steam locomotives
This may also refer to LNER Class F5 No.789 and 790, who were incorrectly classified F6 by the LNER

Other uses
 f6 (cigarette), a German brand
 F6 (classification), a wheelchair sport classification
 F-6, Islamabad, a sector of Islamabad, Pakistan